The history of banking in Ukraine since Ukrainian independence in 1991 has seen since the late 2000s several periods of bank mergers and acquisitions of different natures. Early 2016 117 banks were operating in Ukraine, their assets amounted to ₴1.254 trillion. According to the central bank of Ukraine there were 81 solvent licensed banks in Ukraine on 1 October 2018 whose assets were ₴1.355 trillion ($48 billion).

History
In the years before the 2008–09 Ukrainian financial crisis stakes in Ukrainian banks were mostly acquired by foreign firms who had great hopes that the Ukrainian economy and banking system would soon start to grow rapidly and had (thanks to the flourishing economy prior to the financial crisis of 2007–08) money to invest in Ukraine and lend out. The new owners often bought banks at prices that were five to seven times above their actual value and (the banks they bought) had often a low quality of assets.

During the presidency of Viktor Yanukovych (from February 2010 until his removal from power in February 2014), the mostly foreign bank owners lost hope in the prospects of the Ukrainian economy and banking system under the then Azarov Government. Bank owners sold their assets to Ukrainian businessmen close to the government. These new owners averagely paid 0.5-1.0% of the bank’s value.

After the Revolution of Dignity and due to the Russo-Ukrainian War, Ukraine's economy shrank 6.8% in 2014 and mergers and acquisitions of banks came to a standstill. From early 2014 till November 2015, the National Bank of Ukraine declared 62 (Ukrainian) banks insolvent. In early 2016, 117 banks were operating in Ukraine with assets amounting to ₴1.254 trillion. By August 2016, eight more financial institutions had been declared insolvent. Since July 2015, foreign firms have started to buy Ukrainian banks again. On 17 December 2016, the National Bank of Ukraine withdrew the banking license of Finance and Credit and liquidated the bank. On 1 July 2015, in terms of total assets, this was this bank placed 10th in the top 15 of largest commercial banks in Ukraine. The National Bank declared more than 60 banks insolvent in 2014-2015 and withdraw from the market another 18 financial institutions in 2016.

All Ukraine's banks combined, excluding insolvent banks, posted a loss of ₴66.6 billion in 2015. 71 banks ended 2015 with profit amounting to ₴5.2 billion.

In December 2016, PrivatBank, which holds more than a third of individual bank deposits in Ukraine, was nationalized to "save the banking system." President Poroshenko stated "It’s obvious that the only way to save the bank and ensure the safety of its clients’ funds is to bring it into state ownership".

In 2016, the solvent Ukrainian banks reduced losses compared to 2015 by three times (to ₴18.9 billion). And early 2017 the National Bank considered it possible that Ukrainian banks could reach a level of profits in 2017. In 2018 Ukrainian banks made a profit of ₴21.7 billion. The last time the banking system was profitable had been in 2013, when profit amounted to ₴1.4 billion.

According to the National Bank of Ukraine, there were 81 solvent licensed banks in Ukraine on 1 October 2018 whose assets were ₴1.355 trillion ($48 billion).

On 1 November 2019 all Ukrainian banks had fully switched to the IBAN standard.

See also

 List of banks in Ukraine

References

External links
Bank of Ukraine